Polessky State University is a public university located in Pinsk, Brest Voblast, Belarus. The university was established in 2006. The university offers both undergraduate and post-graduate degree courses.

Faculty 
The university has the following departments and faculties—
 Department of Banking
 Department of Economics
 Department of Biotechnology
 Banking faculty

References

External links 

Universities in Belarus
Educational institutions established in 2006
2006 establishments in Belarus